Tito Ovia is a Nigerian Health technology entrepreneur. She is a public health professional contributing to health care delivery in Nigeria and five other African countries. Tito co-founded Helium Health.

Early life and education 
She had her secondary education at Cheltenham Ladies college and went on to get a BSc in Biomedical sciences from University of Manchester. She went ahead to become a doctor of Biomedicine

Career 
She worked as project manager for Lagos Aids Control  Agency  where she helped prevent the spread of aids. She later joined Orbis and worked in Mongolia.

Tito co-founded Helium Health,  a company with an application that connects about 500 doctors with more than 5000 patients West Africa. 

She is also a co-founder of Magic Fund, a company that provides start up founding for young entrepreneurs 

She was part of the Feminist Coalition,  a gender group that raised  147.86 million naira in about two weeks as funds for food,water and other logistics to support the famous EndSars protest against police brutality winning the  Gatefield people Newsmaker for social justice award 2020.

Ovia was a speaker at the  25th Havard Annual African Business Conference

Awards 
She was listed in Forbes under 30 youngsters contributing to change in the health sector.

In 2018 she was nominated for the Future awards Africa prize for technology. 

in 2021, she was listed among 100 most inspiring women in Nigeria by Leading Ladies Africa 

Ovia also received Ladies Making Impact Science award from Lord's London Dry Gin when the company honored innovators at their 2022 achievers award,

Personal life 
Tito Ovia got married to Ugochukwu Chukwu son of APC chieftain, Chief Tony Chukwu.

References 

Nigerian health care businesspeople
1994 births
Living people